Luxley is a multi-instrumental songwriter and singer from New Orleans, Louisiana. The project was formed in 2012 by solo member Ryan Gray. Luxley gets its name from combining Robin Hood's hometown of Loxley and the Latin word for light, lux. He is known for writing music that expresses a condition called chromasthesia, a syndrome that causes him to unconsciously associate sounds with colors.

History 

After beginning to see local musicians play nearby, and being in a hardcore band in college (e.g. Infinite Hours), Gray was inspired to start a new project again while in medical school at Tulane. After struggling with the decision, he ultimately left school and become a bartender in order to fully pursue his passion for music. On leaving medical school for music, Gray regarded that "with medicine, I could be satisfied and find some bliss, but with music, I could be fulfilled and find bliss outside myself." Luxley was formed in 2012 by Ryan, and he began to play shortly after he left med school with booking assistance by his friend and co-founder, Sky McElroy.

Spirit (2013-present) 
Beginning in early Fall, Luxley began his North American tour as an opening act, along with Milo Greene for Bombay Bicycle Club. He performed this tour as a 4 piece set by hiring 3 other musicians from a nearby city in Lafayette, Louisiana. Former bassist, Joshua Wells, from Royal Teeth [6]  strongly assisted with the recruitment. Luxley faced an obstacle when the touring guitarist was unable to cross the Canada–US border due to some unknown issue. Their bassist was re-arranged in order to accommodate this unexpected change. After their North American stint ended, Luxley was a performer at Voodoo Experience, a music and arts festival in New Orleans, Louisiana. Regarding their tour with Bombay Bicycle Club, Gray admits that it was a big step for him as an artist, as well as a good opportunity to expand his fan base with the opportunity that he had. He also said that Bombay Bicycle Club was "a great band to learn from and be educated by and just become friends with".

Luxley released his single Spirit on October 15, 2014. Spirit features vocals from Nora Patterson of Royal Teeth. Gray describes Spirit as a song about "finding that one person that makes you feel completely alive and wanting to tell them you love them and not knowing how they’ll feel when telling them the first time”.

Luxley released his 5 song debut EP, Spirit, on July 29, 2016.  The EP was recorded and co-produced by former Passion Pit member Ayad-Adhamy in Brooklyn, NYC. Sound engineer and mixer Justin Gerrish, who had previously worked with Vampire Weekend on their Grammy winning album, also contributed to the Spirit EP.

"Gray" Area (2016-2018) 

While doing a series of touring in 2015 and 2016, Luxley shared the stage with Chris Baio of Vampire Weekend and Transgressive Records’ Let’s Eat Grandma in NYC. He eventually picked back up where he left off as a fulltime bartender in New Orleans, and began exploring and writing more electronic-driven music. After spending a lot of time experimenting on synths, electronics, and getting to know himself more as an artist, he realized that he was passionately building a vast library of colorful sounds, textures, and pop-centric melodies that would eventually become the virtual worlds found on his next record, Chromatics.

Chromatics EP (2019-present) 

The Chromatics EP released on March 22, 2019. This record comes from Luxley’s condition called chromasthesia, a syndrome that causes him to unconsciously associate sounds with colors. He reportedly discovered it when he was younger but never shared the experience with anyone until he went to medical school and found literature describing it.
This record is much different from Gray’s last. Chromatics marks a departure from his previous work and the traditional studio model of working with an outside producer. He decided to collect his favorite colored pieces and put them into an EP arranged by the colors that he sees in each track. The colors are evidentially seen in the artwork created for each track. 

The Chromatics main single “Take a Chance”, is a percussive yet moody yet danceable bout of magenta and black. The forthcoming single is “Dreamcatcher”, a tropical burst of teal and blue that takes you through a jungle and runs you off a cliff into secluded waters.

Members

Ryan Gray is a New Orleans native who grew up in a musical environment, with older siblings and a father who played music. After his parents' divorce and being left with his father's guitar, Gray taught himself how to play and began to write music at the age of 14. After being in a band in college and exploring the music scene in Nashville while doing medical research, he was inspired to begin a project when he moved back home for medical school. As a performer, Gray is known for his energetic and lively stage presence.

Sky McElroy is also a New Orleans native who helped found Luxley when Gray came back to New Orleans. He helped originally contribute to booking and managing, but now focuses on distribution and song writing.  In addition to managing, he was the founder of former label Rude Fox records.

Luxley is now assisted by a strong and talented team of creatives in New Orleans, notably Oliver Alexander (photographer), Paul Miller (music agent), and various stylists. His forthcoming record (untitled) is set for spring of 2020 with upcoming singles set for the fall of 2019.

Influences 

Luxley includes fellow music projects Friendly Fires, Two Door Cinema Club, Pretty Lights, DJ Shadow, Tycho, Foals, and Jimmy Eat World among his influences. Gray also  identifies wine, whiskey, summer, spring and early fall as key influences in his songwriting process.

Gray also credits his upbringing in musically celebrated New Orleans for influencing his band's sound. Brass and "blues and jazz guitar" are a New Orleans' characteristic influence in particular. Luxley also strives for a "real" sound in his instrumentation.

Genre

Luxley identifies his genre as chromasthesic. While classified as electronic (originally as wildfire dance rock), in a recent interview, Gray justified this classification by saying that he is pretty insistent about there being a groove and some accidentals (unpredictability) to the music, reflecting the changing of colors.  He describes his music as consisting of 3 colors, a theme he strives for. Similar to the scientific notion of primary colors: red, yellow, and blue.

Discography

See also 
Pretty Lights
Bombay Bicycle Club
DJ Shadow
Tycho
Friendly Fires
Two Door Cinema Club
Jimmy Eats World
Foals

References

External links 
Official band website

Indie rock musical groups from Louisiana
Musical groups from New Orleans